Genius & Friends is a 2005 studio album by rhythm and blues singer Ray Charles, consisting of previously unreleased duets between Ray and artists recorded between 1997 to 2005. The contributing artists were personally chosen by Ray Charles.

Track listing
"All I Want to Do" (Walden, McKinney) with Angie Stone
"You Are My Sunshine" (Davis, Mitchell) with Chris Isaak
"It All Goes By So Fast" (Ken Hirsch, Jay Levy) with Mary J. Blige
"You Were There" with Gladys Knight
"Imagine" (John Lennon) with Ruben Studdard and The Harlem Gospel Singers
"Compared to What" (Gene McDaniels) with Leela James
"Big Bad Love" (Tyrell, Tyrell, Sample) with Diana Ross
"I Will Be There" (Walden, Dakota) with Idina Menzel
"Blame It on the Sun" (Stevie Wonder, Syreeta Wright) with George Michael
"Touch" (Walden, Brooks, McKinney) with John Legend
"Shout" (Walden, Hilden) with Patti LaBelle and the Andrae Crouch Singers
"Surrender to Love" with Laura Pausini
"Busted" (Live) (Harlan Howard) with Willie Nelson
"America the Beautiful" (Katharine Lee Bates, Samuel A. Ward) with Alicia Keys

External links
 Overview of album

Vocal duet albums
Albums produced by Phil Ramone
Ray Charles compilation albums
2005 compilation albums
Rhino Records compilation albums